The McGriddles sandwich (colloquial singular form McGriddle) is a type of breakfast sandwich sold by the international fast food restaurant chain McDonald's. Introduced in 2003, it is available in the following markets: United States, Turkey, Canada, Poland, Japan, Guatemala, Mexico, Philippines, Singapore, and New Zealand (for a limited time).

Product description
The standard McGriddles sandwich consists of fried bacon, a scrambled egg flap, and American cheese between two maple-flavored griddle pancakes embossed with the McDonald's logo.

When McDonald's launched its all-day breakfast menu in October 2015, McGriddles sandwiches were initially excluded from the menu, but were eventually added in September 2016.

Variants
 Sausage
 Sausage, egg, and cheese
 Bacon, egg, and cheese
 Scrapple, egg, and cheese (served in the Philadelphia region)
 Spam, egg and cheese (served in Hawaii)
 Chicken (limited-time trials, exclusively in Kansas, Ohio and Florida; limitedly available in Canada as of 2020)

See also
McMuffin
List of McDonald's products
List of sandwiches

References

External links

McDonald's USA Breakfast and nutrition facts
X-Entertainment article on McGriddles

McDonald's foods
Products introduced in 2003
American sandwiches
Breakfast sandwiches
Fast food